Steinar Þór Guðgeirsson (born 19 August 1971) is a retired Icelandic football midfielder.

References

1971 births
Living people
Steinar Thor Gudgeirsson
Steinar Thor Gudgeirsson
Steinar Thor Gudgeirsson
Association football midfielders
Steinar Thor Gudgeirsson
Expatriate footballers in Belgium
Steinar Thor Gudgeirsson
Steinar Thor Gudgeirsson
Steinar Thor Gudgeirsson
Icelandic football managers